Rhudy Evens (born 13 February 1988) is a French Guianan footballer who currently plays for the ASC Le Geldar as a midfielder.

Career
He plays for the ASC Le Geldar. He made his international debut for French Guiana national football team in 2008.

International goals
As of match played 7 June 2016. French Guiana score listed first, score column indicates score after each Evens goal.

References

External links

1988 births
Living people
Association football midfielders
French Guianan footballers
French Guiana international footballers
ASC Le Geldar players
2014 Caribbean Cup players
2017 CONCACAF Gold Cup players
People from Kourou